Dorcadion hybridum is a species of beetle in the family Cerambycidae. It was described by Ludwig Ganglbauer in 1883. It is known from Greece and Turkey. It contains the varietas Dorcadion hybridum var. niveisuturale.

See also 
Dorcadion

References

hybridum
Beetles described in 1883